Dzhugdil is a rural locality (a selo) in Kurkaksky Selsoviet, Tabasaransky District, Republic of Dagestan, Russia. The population was 916 as of 2010. There are 3 streets.

Geography 
Dzhugdil is located 6 km southeast of Khuchni (the district's administrative centre) by road. Kurkak is the nearest rural locality.

References 

Rural localities in Tabasaransky District